Ants in the Pants may refer to:

 Ants in the Pants (game), a game designed by insect-theme game designer William H. Schaper
 Ants in the Pants (film), a 2000 German comedy film